Malcolm Alan Smith (born 3 August 1970) is an English former professional footballer who played as a midfielder in the Football League for Gillingham and in non-League football for Hythe Town.

References

1970 births
Living people
Sportspeople from Maidstone
English footballers
Association football midfielders
Gillingham F.C. players
Hythe Town F.C. players
English Football League players